Eric Butorac and Raven Klaasen were the defending champions, but Klaasen chose not to participate. Butorac played alongside Scott Lipsky, but lost in the semifinals to Nicholas Monroe and Jack Sock.

Nicholas Monroe and Jack Sock went on to win the title, defeating Mate Pavić and Michael Venus in the final, 7–5, 6–2

Seeds

Draw

Draw

References
 Main Draw

Stockholm Open - Doubles
2015 Stockholm Open